The Terme Euganee International Open was a golf tournament on the Challenge Tour. It was played between 2001 and 2003 in Padua, Italy.

In 2003, Spaniard Ivó Giner fought off his playing partner Martin Erlandsson by one stroke to card a 29-under-par 259 total – the lowest in Challenge Tour history.

Montecchia Golf Club, which hosted the 2002 event, has hosted Challenge Tour events on three other occasions.

Winners

See also
Montecchia Golf Open – other Challenge Tour events at Montecchia Golf Club in 2001, 2013, and 2016

References

External links
Coverage of 2003 event on the Challenge Tour's official site
Coverage of 2002 event on the Challenge Tour's official site
Coverage of 2001 event on the Challenge Tour's official site

Former Challenge Tour events
Golf tournaments in Italy
Sport in Padua